A respirator is a device designed to protect the wearer from inhaling hazardous atmospheres including fumes, vapours, gases and particulate matter such as dusts and airborne pathogens such as viruses. There are two main categories of respirators: the air-purifying respirator, in which respirable air is obtained by filtering a contaminated atmosphere, and the air-supplied respirator, in which an alternate supply of breathable air is delivered. Within each category, different techniques are employed to reduce or eliminate noxious airborne contaminants.

Air-purifying respirators range from relatively inexpensive, single-use, disposable face masks sometimes referred to as a filtering facepiece respirator to a more robust reusable model with replaceable cartridges called an elastomeric respirator. Powered air-purifying respirators (PAPR), use a pump or fan to constantly move air through a filter and supply purified air into a mask, helmet or hood.

Physical form

All respirators have some type of facepiece held to the wearer's head with straps, a cloth harness, or some other method.  Facepieces come in many different styles and sizes to accommodate all types of face shapes. The differences in respirator designs impact the respirator assigned protection factors, i.e. the resulting degree of protection from specific kinds of hazards.

Respirators can have half-face forms that cover the bottom half of the face including the nose and mouth, and full-face forms that cover the entire face. Half-face respirators are only effective in environments where the contaminants are not toxic to the eyes or facial area. For example, someone who is spray painting could wear a half-face respirator, but someone who works with chlorine gas would have to wear a full-face respirator.

Use
A wide range of industries use respirators including healthcare & pharmaceuticals, defense & public safety services (defense, firefighting & law enforcement), oil and gas industries, manufacturing (automotive, chemical, metal fabrication, food and beverage, wood working, paper and pulp), mining, construction, agriculture and forestry, cement production, power generation, shipbuilding, and the textile industry.

Respirators require user training in order to provide proper protection.

User seal check 
Each time a wearer dons a respirator, they must perform a seal check to be sure that they have an airtight seal to the face so that air does not leak around the edges of the respirator. (PAPR respirators may not require this because they don't necessarily seal to the face.) This check is different than the periodic fit test that is performed by specially trained personnel using testing equipment. Filtering facepiece respirators are typically checked by cupping the hands over the facepiece while exhaling (positive pressure check) or inhaling (negative pressure check) and observing any air leakage around the facepiece. Elastomeric respirators are checked in a similar manner, except the wearer blocks the airways through the inlet  valves (negative pressure check) or exhalation valves (positive pressure check) while observing the flexing of the respirator or air leakage. Manufacturers have different methods for performing seal checks and wearers should consult the specific instructions for the model of respirator they are wearing. Some models of respirators or filter cartridges have special buttons or other mechanisms built into them to facilitate seal checks.

Fit testing 

Most types of respirators depend upon forming a good seal between the respirator body and the face of the wearer. Fit testing procedures have been developed to ensure that the respirator is appropriate for the wearer and the wearer's donning technique is capable of creating an adequate seal.  Poor fit can have a negative impact on the respirator's overall filtering effectiveness by as much as 65%. A study on respirator effectiveness conducted in Beijing found that facial fit was the primary contributor to total inward leakage (TIL), based on a test of nine different models.  Facial hair such as a beard can interfere with proper fit.

Qualitative fit testing typically subjects the wearer to an atmosphere containing an aerosol that can be detected by the wearer, such as saccharin or isoamyl acetate, with the wearer reporting whether detectable levels of the aerosol has penetrated into the breathing area. Quantitative fit testing typically uses a specially prepared respirator with an inserted probe. The respirator is donned, and aerosol concentrations inside and outside of the mask are compared and used to determine a numerical fit factor. Typical room atmosphere contains sufficient particulates to perform the test, but aerosol generators can be used to improve the test accuracy.

A U.S. Department of Labor study showed that in almost 40 thousand American enterprises, the requirements for the correct use of respirators are not always met.

Experts note that in practice it is difficult to achieve elimination of occupational morbidity with the help of respirators:

Contrast with surgical mask 

A surgical mask is a loose-fitting, disposable device that creates a physical barrier between the mouth and nose of the wearer and potential contaminants in the immediate environment. If worn properly, a surgical mask is meant to help block large-particle droplets, splashes, sprays, or splatter that may contain viruses and bacteria. Surgical masks may also help reduce exposure from the wearer's saliva and respiratory secretions to others, especially during surgical procedures.

A surgical mask, by design, does not filter or block very small particles from the outside air that may be transmitted by coughs, sneezes, or certain medical procedures to the wearer. Surgical masks also do not provide complete protection from germs and other contaminants because of the loose fit between the surface of the face mask and the face.

Collection efficiency of surgical mask filters can range from less than 10% to nearly 90% for different manufacturers' masks when measured using the test parameters for NIOSH certification.  However, a study found that even for surgical masks with "good" filters, 80–100% of subjects failed an OSHA-accepted qualitative fit test, and a quantitative test showed 12–25% leakage.

The U.S. Centers for Disease Control and Prevention (CDC) recommends surgical masks in procedures where there can be an aerosol generation from the wearer, if small aerosols can produce a disease to the patient.

Surgical N95

Some N95 respirators have also been cleared by the U.S. National Institute for Occupational Safety and Health (NIOSH) and U.S. Food and Drug Administration as surgical and are labeled "surgical N95", "medical respirators," or "healthcare respirators". These protect the patient and others from the wearer's respiratory emissions (as a surgical mask would) as well as protect the wearer from airborne particulates and aerosols (as a standard N95 respirator). Unlike a standard N95 respirator, FDA-cleared "healthcare respirators" also provide protection from high-pressure streams or jets of bodily fluid, such as blood.

The CDC recommends the use of respirators with at least N95 certification to protect the wearer from inhalation of infectious particles including Mycobacterium tuberculosis, avian influenza, severe acute respiratory syndrome (SARS), pandemic influenza, and Ebola.

Escape respirators 

Escape respirators or smoke hoods such as Air-Purifying Escape Respirators are for use by the general public for chemical, biological, radiological, and nuclear  (CBRN) terrorism incidents. The American National Standards Institute (ANSI) and the International Safety Equipment Association (ISEA) established the American National Standard for Air-Purifying Respiratory Protective Smoke Escape Devices to define both test criteria and approval methods for fire/smoke escape hoods. ANSI/ISEA Standard 110 provides design guidance to manufacturers of Respiratory Protective Smoke Escape Devices (RPED) in the form of performance requirements and testing procedures. The standard covers certification, ISO registration for the manufacturer, associated test methods, labeling, conditioning requirements, independent process and quality control audits, and follow-up inspection programs.

ANSI/ISEA 110 was prepared by members of the ISEA RPED group, in consultation with testing laboratories and was reviewed by a consensus panel representing users, health and safety professionals and government representatives. The U.S. Consumer Product Safety Commission uses ANSI/ISEA 110 as the benchmark in their testing of fire escape masks.

Air-purifying respirators 
Air-purifying respirators are respirators that draw in the surrounding air and purify it before it is breathed (unlike air-supplying respirators, which are sealed systems, with no air intake, like those used underwater). Air-purifying respirators are used against particulates, gases, and vapors that are at atmospheric concentrations less than immediately dangerous to life and health. They may be negative-pressure respirators driven by the wearer's inhalation and exhalation, or positive-pressure units such as powered air-purifying respirators (PAPRs).

Air-purifying respirators may use one or both of two kinds of filtration: mechanical filters retain particulate matter, while chemical cartridges remove gases, volatile organic compounds (VOCs), and other vapors.  Additionally, air-purifying respirators may come in many forms: filtering facepiece respirators consist solely of a disposable mechanical filter; elastomeric respirators are reusable but have replaceable filters attached to the mask; and powered air-purifying respirators have a battery-powered blower that moves the airflow through the filters.

According to the NIOSH Respirator Selection Logic, air-purifying respirators are recommended for concentrations of hazardous particulates or gases that are greater than the relevant occupational exposure limit but less than the immediately dangerous to life or health level and the manufacturer's maximum use concentration, subject to the respirator having a sufficient assigned protection factor.  For substances hazardous to the eyes, a respirator equipped with a full facepiece, helmet, or hood is recommended.  Air-purifying respirators are not effective during firefighting, in oxygen-deficient atmosphere, or in an unknown atmosphere; in these situations a self-contained breathing apparatus is recommended instead.

Types of filtration

Mechanical filter
Mechanical filter respirators retain particulate matter such as dust created during woodworking or metal processing, when contaminated air is passed through the filter material. Since the filters cannot be cleaned and reused and have a limited lifespan, cost and disposability are key factors. Single-use, disposable and replaceable cartridge models exist.

Mechanical filters remove contaminants from air in several ways: interception when particles following a line of flow in the airstream come within one radius of a fiber and adhere to it; impaction, when larger particles unable to follow the curving contours of the airstream are forced to embed in one of the fibers directly; this increases with diminishing fiber separation and higher air flow velocity; by diffusion, where gas molecules collide with the smallest particles, especially those below 100 nm in diameter, which are thereby impeded and delayed in their path through the filter, increasing the probability that particles will be stopped by either of the previous two mechanisms; and by using an electrostatic charge that attracts and holds particles on the filter surface.

There are many different filtration standards that vary by jurisdiction.  In the United States, the National Institute for Occupational Safety and Health defines the categories of particulate filters according to their NIOSH air filtration rating.  The most common of these are the N95 respirator, which filters at least 95% of airborne particles but is not resistant to oil.

Other categories filter 99% or 99.97% of particles, or have varying degrees of resistance to oil.

In the European Union, European standard EN 143 defines the 'P' classes of particle filters that can be attached to a face mask, while European standard EN 149 defines classes of "filtering half masks" or "filtering facepieces", usually called FFP masks.

According to 3M, the filtering media in respirators made according to the following standards are similar to U.S. N95 or European FFP2 respirators, however, the construction of the respirators themselves, such as providing a proper seal to the face, varies considerably. (For example, US NIOSH-approved respirators never include earloops because they don't provide enough support to establish a reliable, airtight seal.) Those standards include the Chinese KN95, Australian / New Zealand P2, Korean 1st Class also referred to as KF94, and Japanese DS.

Chemical cartridge

Chemical cartridge respirators use a cartridge to remove gases, volatile organic compounds (VOCs), and other vapors from breathing air by adsorption, absorption, or chemisorption.  A typical organic vapor respirator cartridge is a metal or plastic case containing from 25 to 40 grams of sorption media such as activated charcoal or certain resins.  The service life of the cartridge varies based, among other variables, on the carbon weight and molecular weight of the vapor and the cartridge media, the concentration of vapor in the atmosphere, the relative humidity of the atmosphere, and the breathing rate of the respirator wearer.  When filter cartridges become saturated or particulate accumulation within them begins to restrict air flow, they must be changed.

If the concentration of harmful gases is immediately dangerous to life or health, in workplaces covered by the Occupational Safety and Health Act the US Occupational Safety and Health Administration specifies the use of air-supplied respirators except when intended solely for escape during emergencies. NIOSH also discourages their use under such conditions.

Form factors

Filtering facepiece 

Filtering facepiece respirators are discarded when they become unsuitable for further use due to considerations of hygiene, excessive resistance, or physical damage.  These are typically simple, light, single-piece, half-face masks and employ the first three mechanical filter mechanisms in the list above to remove particulates from the air stream.  The most common of these is the white, disposable Standard N95 variety; another type is the blue, Surgical N95 mask. It is discarded after single use or some extended period depending on the contaminant.

Elastomeric 

Elastomeric respirators are reusable because the facepiece is cleaned and reused, but the filter cartridges are discarded and replaced when they become unsuitable for further use.  These are replaceable-cartridge, multiple-use models. Typically one or two cartridges attach securely to a mask which has built into it a corresponding number of valves for inhalation and one for exhalation.

Powered air-purifying respirators

Powered air-purifying respirators (PAPRs) have a battery-powered blower that moves the airflow through the filters.  They take contaminated air, remove a certain quantity of pollutants and return the air to the user. There are different units for different environments. The units consist of a powered fan which forces incoming air through one or more filters to the user for breathing. The fan and filters may be carried by the user or they may be remotely mounted and the user breathes the air through tubing.

The filter type must be matched to the contaminants that need to be removed. Some PAPR's are designed to remove fine particulate matter, while others are suitable for working with volatile organic compounds as those in spray paints. These must have their filter elements replaced more often than a particulate filter.

Atmosphere-supplying respirators 

These respirators do not purify the ambient air, but supply breathing gas from another source.  The three types are the self contained breathing apparatus, in which a compressed air cylinder is worn by the wearer; the supplied air respirators, where a hose supplies air from a stationary source; and combination respirators that integrate both types.

According to the NIOSH Respirator Selection Logic, atmosphere-supplying are recommended for concentrations of hazardous particulates or gases that are greater than the immediately dangerous to life or health level; where the required assigned protection factor exceeds those of air-purifying respirators; during firefighting (self-contained breathing apparatuses only); in oxygen-deficient atmosphere; and in an unknown atmosphere.

Self-contained breathing apparatus

A self-contained breathing apparatus (SCBA) typically has three main components: a high-pressure air cylinder (e.g., 2200 psi to 4500 psi), a pressure gauge and regulator, and an inhalation connection (mouthpiece, mouth mask or full face mask), connected together and mounted to a carrying frame or a harness with adjustable shoulder straps and belt so it can be worn on the back. There are two kinds of SCBA: open circuit and closed circuit. Most modern SCBAs are open-circuit. 

Open-circuit industrial breathing sets are filled with filtered, compressed air. The compressed air passes through a regulator, is inhaled and exhaled out of the circuit, quickly depleting the supply of air. Air cylinders are made of aluminum, steel, or of a composite construction like fiberglass-wrapped aluminum. The "positive pressure" type is common, which supplies a steady stream of air to stop fumes or smoke from leaking into the mask. Other SCBA's are of the "demand" type, which only supply air when the regulator senses the user inhaling. All fire departments and those working in toxic environments use the positive pressure SCBA for safety reasons.

The closed-circuit type SCBA filters, supplements, and recirculates exhaled gas like a rebreather. It is used when a longer-duration supply of breathing gas is needed, such as in mine rescue and in long tunnels, and going through passages too narrow for a large open-circuit air cylinder.

Supplied air respirator 

Supplied air respirators make use of a hose to deliver air from a stationary source.  It provides clean air for long periods of time and are light weight for the user, although it limits user mobility.  They are normally used when there are extended work periods required in atmospheres that are not immediately dangerous to life and health (IDLH).

Disadvantages 
Extended use of respirators can result in higher levels of carbon dioxide than recommended in a work environment, and can lead to headaches, dermatitis and acne.

Regulation 
The choice and use of respirators in developed countries is regulated by national legislation. To ensure that employers choose respirators correctly, and perform high-quality respiratory protection programs, various guides and textbooks have been developed:

For standard filter classes used in respirators, see Mechanical filter (respirator)#Filtration standards.

History

Earliest records to 19th century

The history of protective respiratory equipment can be traced back as far as the first century, when Pliny the Elder (–79) described using animal bladder skins to protect workers in Roman mines from red lead oxide dust. In the 16th century, Leonardo da Vinci suggested that a finely woven cloth dipped in water could protect sailors from a toxic weapon made of powder that he had designed.

In 1785, Jean-François Pilâtre de Rozier invented a respirator.

Alexander von Humboldt introduced a primitive respirator in 1799 when he worked as a mining engineer in Prussia.
Practically all respirators  in the early 18th century consisted of a bag placed completely over the head, fastened around the throat with windows through which the wearer could see. Some were rubber, some were made of rubberized fabric, and still others of impregnated fabric, but in most cases a tank of compressed air or a reservoir of air under slight pressure was carried by the wearer to supply the necessary breathing air. In some devices certain means were provided for the adsorption of carbon dioxide in exhaled air and the rebreathing of the same air many times; in other cases valves allowed exhalation of used air.

Julius Jeffreys first used the word "respirator" as a mask in 1836. The mask worked by capturing moisture and warmth in exhaled air in a grid of fine metal wires. Inhaled air then was warmed and moistened as it passed through the same metal grid, providing relief to people with lung diseases. The Respirator became popular, and was mentioned in the literature of the day, including in the writings of Elizabeth Gaskell, William Makepeace Thackeray and Charles Dickens.

In 1848, the first US patent for an air-purifying respirator was granted to Lewis P. Haslett for his 'Haslett's Lung Protector,' which filtered dust from the air using one-way clapper valves and a filter made of moistened wool or a similar porous substance. Following Haslett, a long string of patents were issued for air purifying devices, including patents for the use of cotton fibers as a filtering medium, for charcoal and lime absorption of poisonous vapors, and for improvements on the eyepiece and eyepiece assembly. Hutson Hurd patented a cup-shaped mask in 1879 which became widespread in industrial use, and Hurd's H.S. Cover Company was still in business in the 1970s.

Inventors in Europe included John Stenhouse, a Scottish chemist, who investigated the power of charcoal in its various forms, to capture and hold large volumes of gas. He built one of the first respirators able to remove toxic gases from the air, paving the way for activated charcoal to become the most widely used filter for respirators. Irish physicist John Tyndall took Stenhouse's mask, added a filter of cotton wool saturated with lime, glycerin, and charcoal, and in 1871 invented a 'fireman's respirator', a hood that filtered smoke and gas from air, which he exhibited at a meeting of the Royal Society in London in 1874. Also in 1874, Samuel Barton patented a device that 'permitted respiration in places where the atmosphere is charged with noxious gases, or vapors, smoke, or other impurities.' German Bernhard Loeb patented several inventions to 'purify foul or vitiated air,' and counted the Brooklyn Fire Department among his customers.

A predecessor of the N95 was a design by Doctor Lien-teh Wu who was working for the Chinese Imperial Court in the fall of 1910, which was the first that protected users from bacteria in empirical testing. Subsequent respirators were reusable but bulky and uncomfortable. In the 1970s, the Bureau of Mines and NIOSH developed standards for single-use respirators, and the first N95 respirator was developed by 3M and approved in 1972.

World War I
The first recorded response and defense against chemical attacks using respirators occurred during the Second Battle of Ypres on the Western Front in World War I. It was the first time Germany used chemical weapons on a large scale releasing 168 tons of chlorine gas over a four-mile (6 km) front killing around 6,000 troops within ten minutes through asphyxiation. The gas being denser than air flowed downwards forcing troops to climb out of their trenches. Reserve Canadian troops, who were away from the attack, used urine-soaked cloths as primitive respirators. A Canadian soldier realized that the ammonia in urine would react with the chlorine, neutralizing it, and that the water would dissolve the chlorine, allowing soldiers to breathe through the gas.

21st century 
China normally makes 10 million masks per day, about half of the world production. During the COVID-19 pandemic, 2,500 factories were converted  to produce 116 million daily.

During the COVID-19 pandemic, people in the United States, and in a lot of countries in the world, were urged to make their own cloth masks due to the widespread shortage of commercial masks.

See also
 
 
 
 
 
 
 
  (PPE)

References

Bibliography 
 Nancy Bollinger, Robert Schutz et al. NIOSH Guide to Industrial Respiratory Protection. — NIOSH. — Cincinnati, Ohio: DHHS (NIOSH) Publication No. 87-116, 1987. — 305 p.
 Linda Rosenstock et al. TB Respiratory Protection Program In Health Care Facilities. Administrator's Guide. — DHHS (NIOSH) Publication No. 99-143. — Cincinnati, Ohio, 1999. — 120 p.
 Nancy Bollinger et al. NIOSH Respirator Selection Logic. — DHHS (NIOSH) Publication No. 2005-100. — Cincinnati, Ohio, 2004. — 39 p
 Respiratory protective equipment at work. A practical guide. 4 ed. — HSE (UK). — Norwich: Crown, 2013. — 59 p. — .
 BGR/GUV-R 190 Benutzung von Atemschutzgeräten. — Deutsche Gesetzliche Unfallversicherung e.V. (DGUV), Medienproduktion. — Berlin (BRD), 2011. — 174 p.
 Jaime Lara, Mireille Vennes. Guide pratique de protection respiratoire. —  Institut de recherche Robert-Sauvé en santé et en sécurité du travail (IRSST). — Montréal (Canada), 2002. — 56 p. — 
Further reading
 
 
 
 NIOSH respirators main page
 NIOSH respirator fact sheet
 What's Special about Chemical, Biological, Radiological, and Nuclear (CBRN) Air-Purifying Respirators (APR)? NIOSH Fact Sheet
 NIOSH-Approved Disposable Particulate Respirators (Filtering Facepieces)
 TSI Application note ITI-041: Mechanisms of Filtration for High Efficiency Fibrous Filters 
 British Standard BS EN 143:2000: Respiratory protective devices – Particle filters – Requirements, testing, marking
 British Standard BS EN 149:2001: Respiratory protective devices – Filtering half masks to protect against particles – Requirements, testing, marking

External links

3M Safety Respirator Classification Guide 3M.com
Mine Safety Appliance Company (MSA) Respirator Classification Guide MSA.com
CDC Protective Masks Fact Sheet cdc.gov/niosh
Canadian Centre for Occupational Health and Safety (CCOHS) Respirator Selection ccohs.ca
The following links are respirator selection logic and competitive bid research information pages for Chemical, Biological, Radiological, and Nuclear (CBRN) defense responders:
Air-Purifying Respirators (APR): cdc.gov/niosh. Respirator manufacturer approvals for NIOSH-certified air-purifying respirator with CBRN Protections (CBRN APR). This link covers APR and Air-Purifying Escape Respirators (APER) certified by the NIOSH's National Personal Protective Technology Laboratory (NPPTL), Pittsburgh, PA, to CBRN protection NIOSH standards.  CBRN APR are tight-fitting, full-face respirators with approved accessories and protect the user breathing zone by relying on user negative pressure, fit testing and user seal checks to filter less than Immediately Dangerous to Life and Health (IDLH) concentrations of hazardous respiratory compounds and particulates through NIOSH CBRN Cap 1, Cap 2 or Cap 3 canisters for CBRN APR- or CBRN 15- or CBRN 30-rated APER.
PAPR: cdc.gov/niosh. Respirator manufacturer approvals for NIOSH-certified powered air-purifying respirator with CBRN Protections (CBRN PAPR-loose fitting or tight fitting)
OSHA videos on respiratory protection  osha.gov
 Occupational Safety & Health Administration, Respiratory Protection Training Video on respiratory protection
The Invention of the Gas Mask brinkster.com